Evansia is a monotypic genus of dwarf spiders containing the single species, Evansia merens. It was first described by Octavius Pickard-Cambridge in 1901, and has a palearctic distribution.

See also
 List of Linyphiidae species (A–H)

References

Linyphiidae
Monotypic Araneomorphae genera
Palearctic spiders
Taxa named by Octavius Pickard-Cambridge